Jack Allen may refer to:

Jack Allen (actor) (1907–1995), British actor
Jack Allen (footballer, born 1889), English footballer
Jack Allen (footballer, born 1891) (1891–1971), English football player for Glossop, Manchester City, Southport and Crewe Alexandra
Jack Allen (footballer, born 1903) (1903–1957), English football player
Jack Allen (Australian footballer) (1887–1956), Australian rules footballer
Jack Allen (Northern Ireland politician), Unionist in Northern Ireland
John F. Allen (physicist) (1908–2001), physicist
Jack Allen (Adventures in Odyssey), character in a Christian-themed comedy-drama
Jack Allen (baseball) (1855–1915), baseball player
Jack Allen (American football) (born 1992), American football player
Jack Allen (Canadian politician) (1909–1992), reeve of East York in Toronto (1957–1960)

See also
Jack Allan (disambiguation)
John Allen (disambiguation)
Allen (surname)